Joe Gruttola is an American BMX Flatland Freestyler.

Joe started his freestyle career in 1986 during the initial AFA sanctioned freestyle contests on Long Island. Gruttola competed in several 1987 American Freestyle Association sponsored events held throughout the United States. He would go on to win and place in many of the AFA Masters series contests in the 14-15 expert and 16-18 expert flatland division. In 1987 he was sponsored by Haro, and is featured in the 1988 Haro Team Video alongside Matt Hoffman, Rick Moliterno and others.

Accomplishments

Sponsored by Full Factory Haro, co sponsored by Vision Street Wear.

1986 AFA Masters Round 4, 5th place 14-15 expert flatland.
1986 AFA Masters Finals, 1st place 14-15 expert flatland.
1987 AFA Masters Round 1, 1st place 14-15 expert flatland.
1987 ABA Freestyle Nationals Round 2, 1st place 16 and over expert flatland.
1987 AFA Masters Round 5, 1st place 16-18 expert flatland.
1987 AFA Masters Finals, 3rd place 16-18 expert flatland,
1987 AFA Masters Points Champion 16-18 expert flatland.
1988 AFA Masters Round 1, 2nd place 16 expert flatland.
1988 AFA Masters Round 3, 3rd place 17 expert flatland.
1988 AFA Masters Round 5, 1st place 17 expert flatland.
1988 AFA Masters Round 6, 2nd place 17 expert flatland.
1988 AFA Masters Round 8, 4th place 17 expert flatland.

References

Living people
BMX riders
American male cyclists
Year of birth missing (living people)